A prairie oyster (sometimes also prairie cocktail) is a traditional beverage consisting of a raw egg (often yolk alone), Worcestershire sauce, vinegar and/or hot sauce, table salt, and ground black pepper. Tomato juice is sometimes added, reminiscent of a Bloody Mary. The egg is broken into a glass so as not to break the yolk. The mixture is quickly swallowed. The unbroken yolk causes the drink to bear a texture similar to that of an oyster. The concoction has been referred to as a traditional cure for hangovers, and has appeared in media for decades.

Supposed hangover remedy properties 
Though considered a traditional hangover remedy, the prairie oyster has not been scientifically proven to treat hangover symptoms. Headache experts say that a prairie oyster will not work as a remedy for a hangover.

It has been suggested that the raw egg in a prairie oyster may alleviate the symptoms of a hangover since eggs contain cysteine, an amino acid which helps the body break down acetaldehyde, a by-product of processing alcohol. However, there is no reliable evidence showing that consuming foods with this amino acid relieves hangover symptoms. Furthermore, research shows that amino acids in raw eggs are less digestible than amino acids in cooked eggs.

It has also been suggested that a prairie oyster may seem to relieve hangover symptoms by acting as a distraction and a placebo.

In popular culture 
The prairie oyster has appeared in popular media since the early 20th century. Notable appearances include:
In James Joyce's novel "Ulysses", a prairie oyster is mentioned in passing in episode 14.
In P. G. Wodehouse's 1916 short story "Jeeves Takes Charge", Jeeves cures Bertie Wooster's hangover with his version of a prairie oyster. The drink is not named in the story but it fits the description of a prairie oyster. As Jeeves says, "It is a little preparation of my own invention. It is the Worcester Sauce that gives it its colour. The raw egg makes it nutritious. The red pepper gives it its bite." Jeeves also serves this hangover cure in other stories. It is very effective, and Bertie suspects that there is more to the drink than the ingredients mentioned by Jeeves.
In the 1931 film The Last Flight, three of the main characters order a prairie oyster after a night of heavy drinking.
 In the 1934 George Orwell novel Keep the Aspidistra Flying, Ravelston prepares Gordon a prairie oyster in jail.
 In 1935, Barbary Coast saw Edward G. Robinson offer Miriam Hopkins a prairie oyster on New Year's Day.
 In the 1936 Frank Capra film Mr. Deeds Goes to Town, Longfellow Deeds is offered a prairie oyster after a night on the town.
In the 1937 film A Star is Born, Norman Maine (Fredric March) has a prairie oyster at the bar to cure his hangover when he spies Vicky Lester (Janet Gaynor) and begins a conversation.
 Goodbye to Berlin, the 1939 novel by Christopher Isherwood mentions prairie oysters several times, where Sally and Chris drink them in Sally's room. Similar scenes also occur in Cabaret, the 1966 musical; as well as in the 1972 film, in which Sally Bowles regularly makes prairie oysters, remarking that they "work instantly, even on the most sinister hangovers."
 In The Palm Beach Story, the 1942 screwball comedy directed by Preston Sturges, Gerry Jeffers (Claudette Colbert) orders a prairie oyster at breakfast on the train with J.D. Hackensacker III (Rudy Vallée), who orders one too but asks for it "on the half-shell").
In the 1950 Patricia Highsmith novel Strangers on a Train, Charles Anthony Bruno has a prairie oyster to cure his hangover and ready himself to murder Miriam, the wife of a man he met on the train.
 In the 1959 film The Nun's Story, Gaby (Audrey Hepburn) is given the drink to aid her in recovery from suspected tuberculosis.
 In the 1959 film Pillow Talk, the main female character's maid, Alma, starts every day, hungover, with a drink of tomato juice, Tabasco and Worcester sauce. Towards the end of the film, the main male character's best friend makes him a drink to cure his hangover with "a lot of olive oil in it and two raw eggs", tomato juice, Tabasco and Worcester sauce.
In Thunderball, the 1961 novel by Ian Fleming, prior to spending a fortnight at Shrublands ("Gateway to Health"), James Bond states that "there wasn't a week went by but that on at least one day I couldn't eat anything for breakfast but a couple of aspirins and a prairie oyster".
 In the 1972 film version of the musical Cabaret, Sally Bowles makes Brian Roberts a prairie oyster. She lists the ingredients and Brian queries "peppermint"? - it transpired she had served his prairie oyster in her toothpaste glass. 
 In Season 2, episode 17 "The Break-Up, Part 2" (1976), of the television show The Jeffersons,  Tom Willis's (Franklin Cover) daughter Jenny (Berlinda Tolbert) makes a prairie oyster to help her dad with his hangover.
In a 1985 episode of No. 73 (series 5, episode 21), a Saturday morning children’s television show aired in the UK, Neil and Harry each drink a prairie oyster to ward off a hangover purportedly caused by staying out all night drinking fizzy orange juice.
In the 1988 film Heathers, Veronica Sawyer makes Heather Chandler a prairie oyster in an attempt to apologize for an incident at a party the previous night, but it is soon replaced with a glass of liquid drain cleaner, killing Heather Chandler.
 In the 1990 film Back to the Future Part III, Marty gives (egg-free) "wake-up juice" into Doc to wake him up after he instantly passes out from a shot of whiskey in the Old West.
In the 1993 film Addams Family Values, Gomez Addams makes a Prairie Oyster and shakes it up in a bottle to give to his infant son after a night of celebrating Fester's wedding to Debbie.
 In the 1998 episode of the anime Cowboy Bebop "Heavy Metal Queen," the protagonist Spike Spiegel orders a prairie oyster to get over a hangover, although he adds Boofeater (a reference to the London Dry Gin Beefeater) to the cocktail.
 In Season 1, episode 14 “The Harriet Dinner, Part II” (2007) of the television show Studio 60 on the Sunset Strip, Jack Rudolph suggests that Kim Tao be given a prairie oyster after drinking too much tequila.
 In Chris Onstad's long-running webcomic Achewood, and its characters' "blogs", a prairie oyster is mentioned as a hangover cure several times, both in the traditional form, and in a "V8, Miller Lite, & raw egg" version.
 In the 2010 play Heathers: The Musical by Kevin Murphy and Laurence O'Keefe, one of the titular characters, Heather Chandler, requests a prairie oyster, to alleviate the hungover feeling after the party scene.
In the 2011 video game Catherine, the drink is referenced in one of the many cocktail trivia segments that can occur in the bar.
In the 2013 television series Spies of Warsaw episode 3, Lady Angela Hope brings a Prairie Oyster to Jean-Francois Mercier in bed to help with his hangover.
In the American TV show Shameless, the character Mickey is seen preparing one in "The Alibi". (Season 4, Episode 1)

 In the Netflix series Russian Doll, the main character Nadia is seen making a prairie oyster to help with a hangover in the episode "The Great Escape" (Season 1, Episode 2).
 In the Netflix series The Good Cop, Belinda Mannix makes one for Tony Caruso Sr to help with his hangover in the episode "What is the Supermodel's Secret?" (Season 1, Episode 2).
 In the Norwegian series Mammon (season 2, episode 5, min. 45), the new prime minister makes himself a prairie oyster with tomato juice after a long day.
 In the television series Peacemaker (season 1, episode 5), Peacemaker makes a prairie oyster for his hangover.
 It is prepared by characters in the Donna Tartt novel, The Secret History because of its purported hangover cure qualities.
 In Season 1, episode 1 "What You Want and What You Need (2022)", of the television show The English, Richard M Watts (Ciarán Hinds) serves Cornelia Locke (Emily Blunt) prairie oysters for dinner.

See also
Amber Moon, a similar drink containing alcohol

References

Alternative detoxification
Non-alcoholic mixed drinks
Drinking culture
Eggs (food)